The tepui toucanet or Whitely's toucanet (Aulacorhynchus whitelianus) is a near-passerine bird in the toucan family Ramphastidae. It is found in Brazil, Guyana, Suriname, and Venezuela.

Taxonomy and systematics

The tepui toucanet and what is now the chestnut-tipped toucanet (A. derbianus) were for a time considered conspecific. They were separated by major taxonomic systems beginning in 2011.

The tepui toucanet has three subspecies:

 A. w. duidae - Chapman, 1929
 The nominate A. w. whitelianus - Salvin & Godman, 1882
 A. w. osgoodi - Blake, 1941

Description

Its bill is deep red and black with a vertical white line at its base and grooves on the maxilla. The sexes are alike. Their plumage is generally green, with a white throat, yellow-green undertail coverts, and some blue beneath the eye. The nominate subspecies has short dull rufous tips on the tail feathers. Subspecies A. w. duidae is larger than the nominate and larger rufous tail tips. A. w. osgoodi is smaller than the nominate, has no rufous on the tail, and has less blue beneath the eye.

Distribution and habitat

The subspecies of tepui toucanet are found thus:

 A. w. duidae, Venezuela's Amazonas and western Bolívar states and adjacent northern Brazil
 A. w. whitelianus, southeastern Bolívar state in southern Venezuela and northwestern Guyana
 A. w. osgoodi, Serra do Acari in southern Guyana and the Wilhelmina Mountains and Tafelberg in Suriname

Undocumented sight records in French Guiana lead the South American Classification Committee of the American Ornithological Society to treat the species as hypothetical in that country.

In southern Venezuela and nearby Brazil the tepui toucanet inhabits moist subtropical montane cloudforest on tepuis. In eastern Venezuela and the Guianas it inhabits hilly tropical forest.

Behavior

Movement

The tepui toucanet is thought to be generally sedentary but is suspected to make seasonal elevational movements in the tepuis of Venezuela.

Feeding

The tepui toucanet is believed to forage between the forest's lower levels and the subcanopy. It's diet is essentially unknown but is assumed to be similar to the fruit and insects of the chestnut-tipped toucanet. It is mostly seen singly or in pairs but is known to join mixed-species foraging flocks.

Breeding

The tepui toucanet's breeding season appears to be from February to July. Nothing else is known about its breeding biology.

Vocalization

The tepui toucanet's song is "a low grunting 'grank, graank, graank...'".

Status

The IUCN has assessed the tepui toucanet as being of Least Concern, though its population size is not known and is believed to be decreasing. No immediate threats have been identified. It is "[s]till common in some Venezuelan localities" and occurs in at least two protected areas in that country. "Information [is] urgently needed on subspecies osgoodi [which is] potentially threatened, in [its] small Guyana-Surinam range."

References

tepui toucanet
Birds of the Tepuis
Birds of the Guianas
tepui toucanet
tepui toucanet
tepui toucanet